The tangerine darter or river slick (Percina aurantiaca) is a small species of freshwater ray-finned fish, a darter from the subfamily Etheostomatinae, part of the family Percidae, which also contains the perches, ruffes and pikeperches. It is found in the eastern United States. It is insectivorous, picking insect larvae off aquatic plants and the riverbed, and sometimes rolling small stones over to expose prey. It breeds in late spring and early summer, typically in shallow sandy or gravelly riffles. Pollution and habitat degradation may be a problem in parts of its range, however it is a fairly common fish with a wide range and the International Union for Conservation of Nature has classified its conservation status as being of "least concern".

Appearance and anatomy
Tangerine darters are typically  in length, large for a darter species. The males are usually a bright orangish-red color, more elaborately colored than the females, which are yellow.

Distribution

They are a fairly common species; however, their range is limited to clear, cool streams of the southern Appalachian Mountains. The tangerine darter is found throughout mountainous regions of the upper Tennessee River drainage. It resides in smaller rivers and is most common in the Emory, Hiwassee, Little, Little Pigeon, and Tellico rivers. It is found in eastern Tennessee, northern Georgia, and western North Carolina, and Virginia.  In Georgia and North Carolina, it is listed as a historic species in need of management.

Habitat and life history
The tangerine darter inhabits clear and cool creeks or small rivers. In these rivers it likes areas that have large boulders, bedrock and a gravel substrate. It also likes to swim in the deeper riffles of these rivers. In winter, the tangerine moves to deeper pools.

The tangerine darter spawns in shallow sandy gravel riffles that have consistent flowing water.  The tangerine is a late spring to summer spawner. The breeding season, which is triggered by water temperature, begins in May and runs through July. Spawning occurs at about three to four years of age, although sexual maturity comes much earlier for tangerine darters, with males reaching sexual maturity at one year of age and females two years of age. The life span of the tangerine darter is about four years.

Tangerine darters spawn by first the male mounting the female; the female then scatters her eggs over the gravel, while the male disperses milt and fertilizes the eggs. While doing this both the male and female make a quivering motion. Females choose the most brightly colored males (bright orange black line with some blue where orange meets the black). Males also become territorial during mating season and will defend their spawning riffles. Females lay between 120 and 1,100 eggs. The tangerine darter does not care for its eggs.

Diet
The tangerine darter is an insectivorous fish.  Juveniles feed primarily on mayflies and midges, and adults feed on mayflies and caddisflies.  Tangerine darters get their food by searching through the aquatic vegetation and eating the aquatic insects off of the plants.  Adults are also big enough to roll small gravel in search of prey.  Although the tangerine darter is not a game species, it is sometimes caught by fly fishermen using mayfly and caddisfly patterns.

Threats
The biggest threat to the tangerine darter is habitat degradation. This is due to point and nonpoint pollution, erosion and sedimentation.  On the Pigeon River in East Tennessee, tangerine darter populations declined and recovered.  In 1908, Champion International built a paper mill on the little pigeon river and decimated many of the native fish.  In the 1980s the mill cleaned up its refuse and the river is steadily getting better. Tangerine darters have been successfully reintroduced back into the Pigeon River downstream of the paper mill. In general, the tangerine darter has a wide range, has a large number of subpopulations and a large total population size, and no major threats have been identified, so the International Union for Conservation of Nature has classified its conservation status as being of "least concern".

Inline references

General references
Chadwick D. 2010. "Silent Stream." National Geographic Vol 217 Issue 4 116-128.
Etnier D. 1993 "The Fishes of Tennessee" University of Tennessee Press.
Greenberg L. 1993. "A descriptive and experimental study of microhabitat use by young of the year benthic stream fishes" Ecology of Freshwater Fish.
Phillips C. 2007. "Captive Propagation of Tangerine Darters for Re-introduction in the Pigeon River, Tennessee" Master's thesis University of Tennessee
Shceffler P. 2007 Request for Section 26a approval for Pedestrian Bridge at Seven Islands Wildlife refuge"
Watson B. 2006 "Tangerine Darter" North Carolina Wildlife Profiles

Percina
Fish described in 1868